AKM Ziauddin is a Bangladesh Nationalist Party politician and the former Member of Parliament of Khulna-8.

Career
Ziauddin was elected to parliament from Khulna-8 as a Bangladesh Nationalist Party candidate in 1979 in a by-election. The by-election were called after Abdus Sabur Khan, who was elected from two constituencies, resigned and choose to represent Khulna-6.

References

Bangladesh Nationalist Party politicians
Living people
2nd Jatiya Sangsad members
Year of birth missing (living people)